Zheleznodorozhnaya Kazarma 498 km is a rural locality (a station) in Bezrukavsky Selsoviet, Rubtsovsky District, Altai Krai, Russia. The population was 1 as of 2013. There is 1 street.

References 

Rural localities in Rubtsovsky District